The final of the Men's High Jump event at the 2003 Pan American Games took place on Saturday August 9, 2003. Jamaica's winner Germaine Mason set a new national record, with a leap of 2.34 metres.

Medalists

Records

Results

Notes

See also
2003 World Championships in Athletics – Men's high jump
2003 High Jump Year Ranking
Athletics at the 2004 Summer Olympics – Men's high jump

References
Results

High Jump, Men
2003